Dreamcatcher is a 2001 science fiction horror novel by American writer Stephen King, featuring elements of body horror, suspense and alien invasion. The book, written in cursive, helped the author recuperate from a 1999 car accident, and was completed in half a year. According to the author in his afterword, the working title was Cancer. His wife, Tabitha King, persuaded him to change the title. A film adaptation was released in 2003.

King has since soured on the book, as, in 2014, he told Rolling Stone that "I don't like Dreamcatcher very much," and also stated that the book was written under the influence of Oxycontin, which he was on to control the pain from his accident.

Plot summary
Set near the fictional town of Derry, Maine, Dreamcatcher is the story of four lifelong friends: Gary "Jonesy" Jones, Pete Moore, Joe "Beaver" Clarendon and Henry Devlin. As young teenagers, the four saved Douglas "Duddits" Cavell, an older boy with Down syndrome, from a group of sadistic bullies. From their new friendship with Duddits, Jonesy, Beaver, Henry and Pete began to share the boy's unusual powers, including telepathy, shared dreaming, and seeing "the line", a psychic trace left by the movement of human beings.

Jonesy, Beaver, Henry and Pete reunite for their annual hunting trip at the Hole-in-the-Wall, an isolated lodge in the Jefferson Tract. There, they become caught between an alien invasion and an insane retired US Air Force Colonel, Abraham Kurtz. Jonesy and Beaver, who remain at the cabin while Henry and Pete go out for supplies, encounter Richard McCarthy, a disoriented and delirious stranger wandering near the lodge during a blizzard talking about lights in the sky. The victim of an alien abduction, McCarthy grows sicker and dies while sitting on the toilet. An extraterrestrial parasite eats its way out of his anus, after gestating in his bowel, and attacks the two men, killing Beaver. Jonesy inhales the spores of the strange reddish fungus that the stranger and his parasite have spread around the cabin, and an alien entity ("Mr. Gray") takes over his mind.

On the return trip from their supply run, Henry and Pete encounter a woman from the same hunting party as the strange man at the cabin. She is also delirious and infected with a parasite. After crashing their car, Henry leaves Pete with the woman and attempts to return to the cabin by foot. From there, his telepathic senses let him know that Pete is in trouble, Beaver is dead, and Jonesy is no longer Jonesy. Mr. Gray, manipulating Jonesy's body, is attempting to leave the area. The aliens have attempted to infect Earth multiple times, beginning with the Roswell crash in the 1940s, but environmental factors have always stopped them, and the US government has covered up the failed invasion attempts every time. With the infection of Jonesy, who can contain the alien within his mind and also spread the infection, Mr. Gray has become the perfect Typhoid Mary—and he knows it. Mr. Gray hijacks a truck transporting a spore-filled alien corpse while Jonesy, trapped inside a mental stronghold, is powerless to stop him.

It becomes up to Henry—by now a quarantined prisoner of the Army—to convince the military to go after Jonesy/Mr. Gray before it is  too late. Jonesy himself, now a prisoner in his own mind, tries to help. Both of them are convinced that their old friend Duddits may be the key to saving the world. Using telepathic powers gained from the alien fungus, Henry alerts Army officer Owen Underhill of a plan by Kurtz to kill most of the Army personnel to maintain secrecy. The two stage an escape by telepathically inciting a riot among other prisoners, destroying the base in the process. As they flee, the pair is closely pursued by a vengeful Kurtz along with his subordinates Freddy and Perlmutter. Perlmutter is infected with a telepathic parasite and is being used to track Owen and Mr. Gray down, despite his personal reluctance and pain. 

Owen and Henry follow Jonesy/Mr. Gray to Derry, Maine and along the way share their childhood memories, including a time when Duddits and his friends tracked down a missing girl. Henry and Owen unite with Duddits, who is very sick with leukemia. After a tear-filled goodbye with Duddits' mother, the trio use Duddits' powers to follow Jonesy/Mr. Gray southward to Quabbin Reservoir. Mr. Gray intends to infect the local water supply with a dog he has infected with the spores, giving it a parasite. Jonesy is able to slow down Mr. Gray's progress considerably by getting the presence to strongly crave bacon, which it eats raw after obtaining it from a convenience store. The uncooked meat greatly sickens Jonesy's body, giving the trio just enough time to catch up and confront Mr. Gray at the reservoir. 

Using the last of his powers, Duddits helps Henry and Jonesy mentally overcome Mr. Gray as well as help Owen shoot the parasite that emerges from the dog. Duddits dies from the effort, but has prevented Mr. Gray's plans. Kurtz and his men arrive, leaving the infected soldier in their vehicle. They ambush and fatally shoot Owen, but Kurtz is killed by Freddy, who fears that Kurtz will shoot him next. Freddy flees, returning to their vehicle, but is killed by the parasite that was growing inside the now-deceased Perlmutter's body. Exhausted and half-insane, Henry sets the car on fire by shooting its gas tank, destroying the last of the alien presence on earth. He reunites with Jonesy, who passes out from exhaustion.

Months later, Jonesy and Henry reminisce about their time in an underground military compound where they were held following the events at the reservoir. It is revealed that Jonesy was immune to the alien fungus all along, and Mr. Gray was only able to take over his mind because he believed it could - the idea being caught as in a dreamcatcher.

See also
Dreamcatcher (2003 film)
Stephen King bibliography

References

External links 
Book review  on Entertainment Weekly
Dreamcatcher - Characters 

2001 American novels
Novels by Stephen King
Novels set in Maine
Science fiction horror novels
American novels adapted into films
Novels about dreams
Novels about extraterrestrial life
Alien invasions in fiction
Fiction about parasites